Poetic Justice (simplified Chinese: 微笑正仪), is a Singaporean television drama series. It stars Rui En, Dai Yang Tian, Rebecca Lim and Desmond Tan as the main characters in the story. The story revolves around a group of investigative journalists who have very different personalities, but work together to produce the highly popular "Real TV News" program.

It was broadcast on MediaCorp Channel 8 from 11 September 2012 to 8 October 2012. A total of 20 episodes were aired during this period. It will subsequently be aired by Malaysian television channel Astro Shuang Xing from 27 September 2012 to 24 October 2012.

Episodes

See also
List of MediaCorp Channel 8 Chinese Drama Series (2010s)

References

Lists of Singaporean television series episodes
Lists of soap opera episodes